The Rotunda is a specific medieval blackletter script. It originates in Carolingian minuscule. Sometimes, it is not considered a blackletter script, but a script on its own. It was used mainly in southern Europe.

Characteristics

One of the key differences between Rotunda and other blackletter scripts is that broken bows appear only in a few letters such as d.

R rotunda and long S

The r rotunda (ꝛ), "rounded r", is an old letter variant commonly used in rotunda scripts and other blackletter typefaces. It is thought that this variant form of that letter was originally devised either to save space while writing on expensive parchment or for aesthetic reasons.

Italian rotunda 
There is a form of Italian blackletter known as rotunda, as it was less angular than in northern centres. The most usual form of Italian rotunda was littera bononiensis, used at the University of Bologna in the 13th century. Biting is a common feature in rotunda, but breaking is not.

Italian rotunda also is characterized by unique abbreviations, such as q with a line beneath the bow signifying "qui", and unusual spellings, such as x for s ("milex" rather than "miles").

See also

References

Blackletter
Typefaces
Western calligraphy